The Acadie–Bathurst Titan are a major junior ice hockey team based in Bathurst, New Brunswick, Canada. They are members of the Telus Maritimes Division in the Telus Conference of the Quebec Major Junior Hockey League (QMJHL). The team plays its home games at the K. C. Irving Regional Centre. The team won the 2018 Memorial Cup.

History
The franchise was granted in 1969–70 as the Rosemont National. In 1971, they moved from Rosemont to Laval to become the Laval National, and later the Laval Voisins. In 1985, they became the Laval Titan, and in 1994, they became the Laval Titan Collège Français following a merger with the Verdun Collège Français, and then in 1998, they moved to Bathurst. The "Acadie" term in the team name refers to the city's surroundings, where the Acadian population is a majority.

The franchise has won five President's Cups, one of which (in 1999) came during the team's tenure in Bathurst. In the Memorial Cup that year, the team finished winless in the round-robin. The most famous player that has come through the organization would undoubtedly be Mario Lemieux, who was drafted in 1984 by the Pittsburgh Penguins of the National Hockey League (NHL). Lemieux played for the team during its tenure in Laval. Other famous franchise alumni include Mike Bossy, Gino Odjick and Vincent Damphousse. Notable NHL alumni from Bathurst include Patrice Bergeron, François Beauchemin, Bruno Gervais and Roberto Luongo.

In the 1999–2000 season, the Titan had the first female to be drafted by a QMJHL team, Charline Labonté, a 17-year-old Quebec goaltender who spent parts of two seasons with the team.

In 2018, the team won its first Memorial Cup championship, defeating the Regina Pats in the centennial edition of the tournament, coached by Mario Pouliot.

The Titan play in the smallest market in the Canadian Hockey League. With a population of 13,424 residents, the city of Bathurst is smaller than Swift Current, Saskatchewan, home of the WHL's Swift Current Broncos. After their Memorial Cup win in 2018, coach Mario Pouliot made this comment: "Being the smallest market in the entire CHL, it's a huge accomplishment for us. Four years ago we started from the bottom and we ended up tonight with the Memorial Cup..."

Relocation speculation
On February 7, 2009, the Titan franchise was given a 30-day relocation application extension by the QMJHL Board of Governors. Morrissette decided to sell the team to his daughter Annie Morrissette-Hébert and his son Stéphane Morrissette. At the end of the 2009–10 season, Léo-Guy Morrissette bought back control of the team from his children at their request. He retained ownership of the team through to April 2013. Local investors including NHL player Sean Couturier purchased the team. At the time of the sale, the team was reported to be worth just over $3 million.

Players

NHL alumni

 Ramzi Abid
 François Beauchemin
 Patrice Bergeron
 Patrick Bordeleau
 Mathieu Carle
 Jean-Philippe Côté
 Noah Dobson
 Jonathan Ferland
 Ryan Flinn
 Bruno Gervais
 Jonathan Girard
 Simon Lajeunesse
 Roberto Luongo
 Mathieu Perreault
 Janis Sprukts

Retired numbers
List of retired numbers from 1969 to present.

1 - Roberto Luongo 
10 - Claude Lapointe
17 - Mike Bossy
19 - Neil Carnes
21 - Vincent Damphousse
22 - Martin Lapointe
28 - Thomas Beauregard
30 - Gino Odjick
37 - Patrice Bergeron
66 - Mario Lemieux

Season-by-season record
 Acadie–Bathurst Titan 1998–2017

OL = Overtime loss, SL = Shootout loss, Pct = Winning percentage

Playoffs

See also
List of ice hockey teams in New Brunswick

References

External links
Official Site
Official Site 

1969 establishments in New Brunswick
Ice hockey teams in New Brunswick
Quebec Major Junior Hockey League teams
Sport in Bathurst, New Brunswick
Ice hockey clubs established in 1969